Ubah Hassan (born 27 August 1982) is a Somali-Canadian model. She has worked with a number of top designers and is also involved in philanthropic work.

Personal life
Hassan was born in Somalia in 1982.  In 1994 she immigrated to Seattle under a sponsorship. Her mother and siblings were unable to join her. Her mother remarried and moved the remaining  family to Norway.

Career
Hassan was talent-spotted in a park in Canada by a photographer, and was subsequently signed with Click Model Management in New York City. There, she started doing photoshoots and walking fashion runways.

In May 2008, Hassan was featured as Model.com's model of the week. She was the face of Ralph Lauren's s/s 09 campaign the following year. Hassan has also done work with other top designers, including Oscar de la Renta, Rachel Roy, Malan Breton, Betsey Johnson, and Gucci.

Hassan is signed to  Richard's International Model Management in Vancouver, her mother agency. She is also represented by Public Image Management agency, in Montreal.

In October 2022, Hassan was announced to be one of the seven stars of the rebooted 14th season of The Real Housewives of New York City.

Philanthropy
Additionally, Hassan is involved in philanthropic work. She has worked closely with the TOMS global charity, traveling to Cambodia.

In 2015, Ubah!, a documentary short about Hassan and her activism directed by Joe Berlinger, also premiered on CNN.

References

External links
 Model Resource - Ubah Hassan

1987 births
Living people
Ethnic Somali people
Somalian female models
Somalian emigrants to Canada
Canadian female models